São Paulo Province was one of the provinces of Brazil.

Provinces of Brazil